Bainter Town is an unincorporated community in Jackson Township, Elkhart County, Indiana.

History
A Mr. Bainter owned the mill in which the town is named after.

Geography

References

Unincorporated communities in Elkhart County, Indiana
Unincorporated communities in Indiana